Ryan Stephen Blaum (born October 16, 1983) is an American professional golfer who currently plays on the PGA Tour, having previously played on Korn Ferry Tour, PGA Tour Latinoamérica and the NGA Pro Golf Tour.

Amateur career
Blaum played college golf at Duke University and was named as Duke University's Most Valuable Player and the Atlantic Coast Conference Rookie of the Year during the 2002-03 season. He followed this by being named the Atlantic Coast Conference Player of the Year in the 2004–05 season.

Blaum has also participated four times in the U.S. Amateur reaching the second round in 2001 and 2005.

Professional career
In 2009, Blaum qualified for the U.S. Open and missed the cut by a single stroke, this was his only appearance in a major championship until 2014 when he again played in the U.S. Open and failed to make the cut.

In his early professional career, Blaum mainly played on U.S. mini-tours although he did make occasional appearances on the PGA Tour and Nationwide Tour with a best finish of tied for 15th at the Puerto Rico Open on the PGA Tour in 2008. He also played sparingly on the Challenge Tour in Europe in 2010 and 2011. His best finish was tied for second at the 2010 Allianz EurOpen Strasbourg.

In 2012, Blaum took up membership on the inaugural season of PGA Tour Latinoamérica, however his first season on the tour was winless. In 2012, Blaum also won the 79th Waterloo Open Golf Classic in Iowa.

Blaum's breakthrough on PGA Tour Latinoamérica came during the 2013 season which featured two victories at the Dominican Republic Open and the Aberto do Brasil. These two victories combined with a further five top-10 finishes helped Blaum to finish in first place on the PGA Tour Latinoamérica Order of Merit for 2013, a ranking which earned him an automatic place on the 2014 Web.com Tour. In his first three seasons on the Web.com Tour, Blaum earned enough to qualify for the Web.com Tour Finals, but did not earn a PGA Tour card.

Amateur wins
 2004 Eastern Amateur

Professional wins (11)

PGA Tour Latinoamérica wins (2)

NGA Pro Golf Tour wins (6)
 2007 Charleston Miracle League Open
 2008 Michelob Ultra Classic
 2011 Kandy Waters Memorial Classic
 2013 Magnolia Bluffs Casino Classic
 Two other wins on the NGA Pro Golf Tour

eGolf Professional Tour wins (2)
2007 Salisbury Classic
2008 Pete Dye Classic

Other wins (1)
 2012 Waterloo Open Golf Classic

Results in major championships

CUT = missed the half-way cut

Summary

 Most consecutive cuts made – 0
 Longest streak of top-10s – 0

U.S. national team appearances
Amateur
 Palmer Cup: 2005 (winners), 2006

See also
2016 Web.com Tour Finals graduates

References

External links
 
 
 

American male golfers
Duke Blue Devils men's golfers
PGA Tour Latinoamérica golfers
European Tour golfers
PGA Tour golfers
Korn Ferry Tour graduates
Golfers from Miami
People from Osceola County, Florida
1983 births
Living people